The National Library of the Cook Islands – Runanga Puka is the national library of the Cook Islands.

Planning for the library began in 1961, with a committee backed by the Resident Commissioner Oliver Dare. A site on Taputapuatea was donated by the Makea Nui Ariki and the Parliament of the Cook Islands agreed to match donations with public money. Plans for the library were drawn up by New Zealand Ministry of Works architect Kenneth Mills.

See also 
 List of national libraries

References

External links 
 https://www.culture.gov.ck/national-library/ 

Cook Islands
Libraries in the Cook Islands
Buildings and structures in the Cook Islands
Avarua